An osmometer is a device for measuring the osmotic strength of a solution, colloid, or compound.

There are several different techniques employed in osmometry:
 Vapor pressure osmometers determine the concentration of osmotically active particles that reduce the vapor pressure of a solution.
 Membrane osmometers measure the osmotic pressure of a solution separated from pure solvent by a semipermeable membrane.
 Freezing point depression osmometers may also be used to determine the osmotic strength of a solution, as osmotically active compounds depress the freezing point of a solution.

Osmometers are useful for determining the total concentration of dissolved salts and sugars in blood or urine samples. Osmometry is also useful in determining the molecular weight of unknown compounds and polymers.

Osmometry is the measurement of the osmotic strength of a substance. This is often used by chemists for the determination of average molecular weight.

Osmometry is also useful for estimating the drought tolerance of plant leaves.

See also 
 Clifton nanolitre osmometer, an example of a freezing point depression osmometer.

References 

Scientific techniques
Measuring instruments
Polymer chemistry
Amount of substance